In molecular biology, Glycoside hydrolase family 19 is a family of glycoside hydrolases.

Glycoside hydrolases  are a widespread group of enzymes that hydrolyse the glycosidic bond between two or more carbohydrates, or between a carbohydrate and a non-carbohydrate moiety. A classification system for glycoside hydrolases, based on sequence similarity, has led to the definition of >100 different families. This classification is available on the CAZy web site, and also discussed at CAZypedia, an online encyclopedia of carbohydrate active enzymes. y[ _]9

Glycoside hydrolase family 19 CAZY GH_19 comprises enzymes with only one known activity; chitinase.

Chitinases are enzymes that catalyze the hydrolysis of the beta-1,4-N-acetyl-D-glucosamine linkages in chitin polymers. Chitinases belong to glycoside hydrolase families 18 or 19. Chitinases of family 19 (also known as classes IA or I and IB or II) are enzymes from plants that function in the defence against fungal and insect pathogens by destroying their chitin-containing cell wall. Class IA/I and IB/II enzymes differ in the presence (IA/I) or absence (IB/II) of a N-terminal chitin-binding domain. The catalytic domain of these enzymes consist of about 220 to 230 amino acid residues.

Active site 

GH19 enzymes has a conserved sequence motif ([FHY]-G-R-G-[AP]-ζ-Q-[IL]-[ST]-[FHYW]-[HN]-[FY]-[NY], ζ= hydrophilic amino acid) in its active site.

References 

EC 3.2.1
GH family
Protein families